National Security Bureau (BBN) is a Polish government agency executing the tasks given by the President of the Republic of Poland regarding national security. The Bureau serves as the organizational support to the National Security Council.

The Chief of the National Security Bureau answers to the President. Shortly after the creation of NSB (1991) it was a part of Office of the President of the Republic of Poland in place of the Ministry of State for the National Security, which it succeeded.

Heads of the National Security Bureau
 Jerzy Milewski – from 8 February 1991 until 13 June 1994
 Henryk Goryszewski – from 14 June 1994 until 22 December 1995
 Jerzy Milewski – from 3 January 1996 until 10 February 1997
 Marek Siwiec – from 19 February 1997 until 17 June 2004
 Major General Tadeusz Bałachowicz – from 18 June 2004 until 28 February 2005 (in charge of the Bureau as the Deputy Head of the Bureau)
 Jerzy Bahr – from 1 March 2005 until 22 December 2005
 Fleet Admiral Ryszard Łukasik – from 23 December 2005 until 12 January 2006 (in charge of the Bureau as the Deputy Head of the Bureau)
 Andrzej Urbański – from 13 January 2006 until 24 August 2006 (acting head of the Bureau)
 Władysław Stasiak – from 24 August 2006 until 8 August 2007
 Major General Roman Polko – from 9 August 2007 until 15 November 2007 (in charge of the Bureau as the Deputy Head of the Bureau)
 Władysław Stasiak - from 16 November 2007 until 15 January 2009
 Aleksander Szczygło - from 15 January 2009 until 10 April 2010
 Stanisław Koziej - from 10 April 2010 until 6 August 2015
 Paweł Soloch - from 7 August 2015 until 10 October 2022
 Jacek Siewiera - from 11 October 2022

External links
 

Government agencies of Poland
National security institutions